Half-Caste also called The Real Story of Half-Caste is a 2004 documentary-style horror film written and directed by Sebastian Apodaca.  Set in Southern Africa, it centers around a group of documentary makers who search for the Half-Caste, a hybrid creature that is said to be part man and part leopard.

Plot

One of Africa's most shocking legends comes to life in this terrifying tale of four students whose fascination with tales of a half-human, half-leopard man-beast find them fighting for their lives. The tales have been passed down through the generations, but few have lived to see the horrific monstrosity firsthand and lived to tell the tale. Now, as four students venture into the wilderness under the flawed theory of safety in numbers, the beast will make itself known, and the curious students will find out why some legends are best left to the storytellers.

Cast
 Sebastian Apodaca as Bobby G.  Cortez
 Robert Pike Daniel as Jan
 Kim Te Roller as Babzy-Cole
 Kathy Wagner as Cleo
 Greg Good as Ray
 Hylton Lea as Lourence 
 Rob Zazzali as Gert
 Yvans Jourdain as Chris
 Kelly Cohen as Terry
 Philip Graham as Half-Caste

Release
Universal Studios released the film on DVD on August 3, 2004 and was released again on DVD as a triple feature by Screen Media on August 24, 2010. and was released theatrically  on Jan 25, 2006.

Reception

Critical reception for the film has been extremely negative.

Bill Gibron from DVD Talk panned the film calling it one of the worst independent films ever made.
Bill Thompson from Sound on Sight.com gave the film a negative review panning the film's acting, editing, and camera work stating, "There are horror movies and then there is Half-Caste, causing horror fans everywhere who think the genre can do no wrong to weep uncontrollably as they are subjected to its awfulness".

References

External links
 
 
 

2004 direct-to-video films
2000s English-language films
2004 horror films
2000s mockumentary films
Films about shapeshifting
English-language South African films
Direct-to-video horror films
2000s supernatural horror films
2004 films
South African horror films